Finland participated in the Eurovision Song Contest 2004 with the song "Takes 2 to Tango" written by Mika Toivanen and Jari Sillanpää. The song was performed by Jari Sillanpää. The Finnish broadcaster Yleisradio (Yle) returned to the Eurovision Song Contest after a one-year absence following their relegation from 2003 as one of the bottom five countries in the 2002 contest. Yle organised the national final Euroviisut 2004 in order to select the Finnish entry for the 2004 contest in Istanbul, Turkey. 20 entries were selected to compete in the national final, which consisted of two semi-finals and a final, taking place in January 2004. Ten entries competed in each semi-final and the top six from each semi-final, as selected solely by a public vote, advanced to the final. Twelve entries competed in the final on 24 January where votes from six regional juries first selected the top six to advance to a second round. In the second round, votes from the public selected "Takes 2 to Tango" performed by Jari Sillanpää as the winner with 98,987 votes.

Finland competed in the semi-final of the Eurovision Song Contest which took place on 12 May 2004. Performing as the opening entry for the show in position 1, "Takes 2 to Tango" was not announced among the top 10 entries of the semi-final and therefore did not qualify to compete in the final. It was later revealed that Finland placed fourteenth out of the 22 participating countries in the semi-final with 51 points.

Background 

Prior to the 2004 contest, Finland had participated in the Eurovision Song Contest thirty-seven times since its first entry in 1961. Finland's best result in the contest achieved in 1973 where the song "Tom Tom Tom" performed by Marion Rung placed sixth.

The Finnish national broadcaster, Yleisradio (Yle), broadcasts the event within Finland and organises the selection process for the nation's entry. Yle confirmed their intentions to participate at the 2004 Eurovision Song Contest on 28 April 2003. Finland's entries for the Eurovision Song Contest have been selected through national final competitions that have varied in format over the years. Since 1961, a selection show that was often titled Euroviisukarsinta highlighted that the purpose of the program was to select a song for Eurovision. Along with their participation confirmation, the broadcaster announced that the Finnish entry for the 2004 contest would be selected through the Euroviisut selection show.

Before Eurovision

Euroviisut 2004 
Euroviisut 2004 was the national final that selected Finland's entry for the Eurovision Song Contest 2004. The competition consisted of three shows that commenced with the first of two semi-finals on 16 January 2004 and concluded with a final on 24 January 2004. All shows were broadcast on Yle TV2 and Yle FST.

Format 
The format of the competition consisted of three shows: two semi-finals and a final. Ten songs competed in each semi-final and the top six entries from each semi-final qualified to complete the twelve-song lineup in the final. The results for the semi-finals were determined exclusively by a public vote, while the results in the final were determined by public voting and jury voting. Public voting included the options of telephone and SMS.

Competing entries 
A submission period was opened by Yle which lasted between 30 July 2003 and 17 October 2003. All singer(s) had to hold Finnish citizenship or live in Finland permanently in order for the entry to qualify to compete. A panel of ten experts appointed by Yle selected twenty entries for the competition from the 325 received submissions. The experts were Kjell Ekholm (Director of Entertainment at Yle FST), Nina Andrén (blogger and Eurovision expert), Maria Guzenina (presenter and journalist at Radio Aino), Jorma Hietamäki (music director of Yle Radio Suomi), Heikki Hilamaa (Head of Music at YLEXQ), Jani Juntunen (radio presenter), Thomas Lundin (editor at Yle FST), Iris Mattila (music journalist at Yle Radio Suomi), Asko Murtomäki (Eurovision expert) and Tarja Närhi (music journalist at Yle Radio Suomi). The competing entries were presented on 19 November 2003.

Shows

Semi-finals
The two semi-final shows took place on 16 and 17 January 2004 at the Tohloppi Studios in Tampere, hosted by Finnish journalists/presenters Maria Guzenina and Bettina Sågbom. The top six from the ten competing entries in each semi-final qualified to the final based on the results from the public vote. A total of 70,270 votes were cast over the two shows: 43,210 in the first semi-final and 27,060 in the second semi-final.

Final
The final took place on 24 January 2004 at the Tampere Hall in Tampere, hosted by Finnish journalists/presenters Maria Guzenina, Bettina Sågbom and Antero Mertaranta. The twelve entries that qualified from the preceding two semi-finals competed and the winner was selected over two rounds of voting. In the first round, the top six from the twelve competing entries qualified to the second round based on the votes of six regional juries. Each jury group distributed their points as follows: 1, 2, 4, 6, 8 and 10 points. In the second round, "Takes 2 to Tango" performed by Jari Sillanpää was selected as the winner based on the results from the public vote. 280,542 votes were cast in the superfinal. In addition to the performances of the competing entries, the interval act featured Christine Guldbrandsen.

At Eurovision

It was announced that the competition's format would be expanded to include a semi-final in 2004. According to the rules, all nations with the exceptions of the host country, the "Big Four" (France, Germany, Spain and the United Kingdom), and the ten highest placed finishers in the 2003 contest are required to qualify from the semi-final on 12 May 2004 in order to compete for the final on 15 May 2004; the top ten countries from the semi-final progress to the final. On 23 March 2004, a special allocation draw was held which determined the running order for the semi-final and Finland was set to open the show and perform in position 1, before the entry from Belarus. At the end of the semi-final, Finland was not announced among the top 10 entries in the semi-final and therefore failed to qualify to compete in the final. It was later revealed that Finland placed fourteenth in the semi-final, receiving a total of 51 points.

The semi-final and the final were televised in Finland on Yle TV2 with commentary in Finnish by Markus Kajo and Asko Murtomäki. The three shows were also broadcast on YLE FST with commentary in Swedish by Thomas Lundin as well as via radio with Finnish commentary by Sanna Pirkkalainen and Jorma Hietamäki on Yle Radio Suomi. The Finnish spokesperson, who announced the Finnish votes during the final, was Anna Stenlund.

Voting 
Below is a breakdown of points awarded to Finland and awarded by Finland in the semi-final and grand final of the contest. The nation awarded its 12 points to Estonia in the semi-final and to Sweden in the final of the contest.

Points awarded to Finland

Points awarded by Finland

References

External links
  Full national final on Yle Elävä Arkisto

2004
Countries in the Eurovision Song Contest 2004
Eurovision
Eurovision